Ittihad Fkih Ben Salah is a Moroccan football club based in Fkih Ben Salah. The club plays in GNF 2 (Moroccan Second Division).

History
The club spent 4 seasons in the 1st division between 1980 and 1984.

Key dates
 1962 : Creation of the club
 1970 : Promoted to D2
 1980 : Promoted to D1
 1984 : Relegated to D2
 2008 : Promoted to GNF2 (D2)

References

Football clubs in Morocco
Association football clubs established in 1962
1962 establishments in Morocco
Sports clubs in Morocco